Zakaria Aguletsi (1630-1691) or  Zakaria of Agulis was a merchant born in Agulis located in present day Nakhchivan who gained recognition for his extensive writings about his travels to various countries. He meticulously documented the cultural, social, and economic aspects of the places he visited, and his journals remain a valuable resource for scholars and historians.

Biography 
Zakaria is best known for his travel journals, which he meticulously wrote during his journeys to various countries, including Persia, India, Russia, and Turkey, among others. His writings provide a rare insight into the cultural, social, and economic conditions of the regions he visited, as well as his observations on local customs, traditions, and beliefs.

Zakaria's journals were not only a record of his personal experiences but also served as valuable information for other merchants and traders. He shared detailed information on trade routes, commodities, and pricing, which helped his fellow merchants in making informed business decisions.

Zakaria of Agoulis' travel diary during his voyage to Europe from the Araxes to Amsterdam via Venice in 1657-9, and his subsequent return journey in 1659-60 through Cadiz, was released in Yerevan in 1938.

See also 
Shemavon of Agulis

References

External links 
The Journal of Zak’aria of Agulis - Cambridge Press

People from the Nakhchivan Autonomous Republic
Persian Armenians
17th-century people of Safavid Iran
1630 births
1691 deaths